Don Morel is an American football coach. He is the head football coach at Wabash College in Crawfordsville, Indiana, a position he has held since 2016.  More served as the head football coach at the University of La Verne in La Verne, California from 1995 to 2006.

Head coaching record

References

External links
 Wabash profile

Year of birth missing (living people)
Living people
Cal State Fullerton Titans football coaches
La Verne Leopards football coaches
Wabash Little Giants football coaches
University of La Verne alumni